The 1998–99 Scottish Third Division was won by Ross County who, along with second placed Stenhousemuir, gained promotion to the Second Division. Montrose finished bottom.

Table

References

Scottish Third Division seasons
Scot
3